John Joseph Chapman (October 15, 1899 – November 3, 1953) was a professional baseball player.  He was a shortstop for one season (1924) with the Philadelphia Athletics.  For his career, he compiled a .282 batting average in 71 at-bats, with seven runs batted in.

An alumnus of Mount St. Mary's University, he was born in Centralia, Pennsylvania and died in Philadelphia at the age of 54.

External links

1899 births
1953 deaths
Philadelphia Athletics players
Major League Baseball shortstops
Baseball players from Pennsylvania
New Haven Profs players
Birmingham Barons players
Chattanooga Lookouts players
Mobile Bears players
Beaumont Exporters players
Atlanta Crackers players
Nashville Vols players
Reading Red Sox players
Mount St. Mary's Mountaineers baseball players